Lara Catherina Stone (born 20 December 1983) is a Dutch fashion model. First discovered in the Paris Metro when she was 12, she then went on to participate in the Elite Model Look competition at age 15. Stone has appeared on the covers of W and Vogue and has worked with brands like Fendi, Chanel, Marc Jacobs, Stella McCartney, H&M, Prada, Louis Vuitton, and Versace among others. She has been signed with The Lions, IMG Models, and Elite Model Management.

Early life
Stone was born in Geldrop and grew up in Mierlo, a small town in the Netherlands. She has Dutch mother Kathryna and an English father, Michael Stone. She was discovered in the Paris Metro while on holiday with her family when she was 12, and she also took part in the Elite Model Look competition in 1999 when she was 15. Although she did not win, she impressed the Elite executives and was signed to the Elite Modelling Agency.

Modeling career

Breakthrough: 2006–2008
Stone left Elite and signed with IMG Models worldwide in 2006. In January, she made her catwalk debut when Riccardo Tisci put her in his Givenchy couture shows during Paris Fashion Week. Later that year, she signed an exclusive for Calvin Klein. In 2007, she was the subject of a spread in March's Vogue Paris in the style of Brigitte Bardot and also appeared on the cover of the April issue. The New York Times''' fashion critic Cathy Horyn named her the "anti-model" in her On the Runway blog; describing her as "not your typical catwalk android with her gapped front teeth, stunned expression, and Lurch walk, which can be attributed to her small foot size 7 – catwalk shoes are at least a size larger." New York Magazine to rank her No. 2 on their "Top Ten Models to Watch" for in New York Fashion Week.

Stone has opened shows for Giles Deacon, Isabel Marant, Christopher Kane, Fendi, and MaxMara, and closed for Chanel, Diesel, Marc Jacobs, Stella McCartney, and Balmain. She has also been a "semi-exclusive" for Prada, meaning she could not walk any other shows during New York Fashion Week or any shows in Milan before the Prada show.

Her spring/summer 2008 campaigns included Givenchy, Belstaff, Just Cavalli, and H&M. Her campaigns for autumn/winter 2008 included Calvin Klein, Givenchy, Belstaff, Hugo Boss, Calvin Klein Cosmetics, and Jil Sander. Stone was one of the models chosen to be on one of the fourteen covers of V magazine's September 2008 issue - shot by Inez van Lamsweerde and Vinoodh Matadin, each cover has a headshot of a model, either from the newer generation of models or the supermodel era.

2009–present
Stone was also photographed alongside Małgosia Bela, Daria Werbowy, Randal Moore, Mariacarla Boscono, Emanuela de Paula, and Isabeli Fontana for the 2009 Pirelli Calendar.

In the February 2009 edition of Vogue Paris, which featured Stone on the cover, she said she does not like the runway and that her unusually small feet for a person of her size does not fit in shoes. Stone was featured on the August 2009 cover of W, declaring her "Fashion's It Girl" and the reasons she is the most-wanted face and body in the business. Vogue Paris named her one of the top 30 models of the 2000s. Stone made her American Vogue debut on the May 2009 cover alongside Liya Kebede, Anna Jagodzinska, Natalia Vodianova, Caroline Trentini, Jourdan Dunn, Raquel Zimmermann, Sasha Pivovarova, Natasha Poly, Karen Elson, and Isabeli Fontana as one of the "Faces of the Moment." It was also a special issue because the cover featured models instead of celebrities. An international racial controversy arose when she appeared in an editorial for French's Vogue October 2009 issue with her face and body blackened.

In 2010, Stone replaced Sasha Pivovarova as the new face for Prada's fragrance Infusion d'Iris, shot by Steven Meisel. Her other spring/summer campaigns included Louis Vuitton, Versus by Versace Fragrance, Jaeger, and H&M. This same year her look sparked a trend in: blonde, gap-toothed, big-lipped models like Georgia May Jagger, Lindsey Wixson, and Ashley Smith. The look even inspired Tyra Banks to have a contestant's tooth gap widened on cycle 15 of America's Next Top Model.

Stone signed an exclusive deal with Calvin Klein Inc., making the 26-year-old model the face of the Calvin Klein Collection, CK Calvin Klein, and Calvin Klein Jeans for fall 2010. It marked the first time in years the fashion house had chosen to use one model for three of its brands, and Stone would be exclusive to CKI for all apparel advertising and runway appearances for fall. At the end of the year, she won the British Fashion Awards' Model of the year 2010.

Stone was featured in the 2011 Pirelli Calendar photographed by Karl Lagerfeld. Stone was part Vogue UKs first multi-cover in the publication's 95 years, landing one of the three May 2011 covers in celebration of the Wedding of Prince William of Wales and Kate Middleton. She debuted on Forbes' World's Top-Earning Models list, ranking No. 7, with estimated earnings of $4.5 million since May of last year (2010–2011).

Stone was again featured in the 2012 Pirelli Calendar, photographed by Mario Sorrenti and also as the face of Calvin Klein's 2012 Underwear campaign.

Stone was ranked #1 on models.com's "Top 50 Models" list from Spring 2010 to Summer 2012 before moving to their "Industry Icons" list and she was also ranked the 9th sexiest model on their Top Sexiest Models list.

In March 2014, Stone again appeared on the cover of Vogue Paris and, in April, American Harper's Bazaar.

In March 2015, Stone appeared on one of three Vogue Paris covers alongside Kate Moss and Daria Werbowy. Stone was also on the August cover of British Vogue, shot by Mario Testino.

Acting career
In 2016, Stone made a cameo appearance in Mandie Fletcher's Absolutely Fabulous: The Movie.

Stone starred with Yvan Attal, Mathilde Bisson, Arthur Igual and Akaji Maro in the short film En Moi ("In Me") directed by Laetitia Casta. The film was selected for the closing ceremony of the 2016 Cannes Film Festival Critic's Week.

Personal life
In the December 2009 issue of Vogue UK'', Stone said she was undergoing inpatient rehabilitation for alcoholism earlier in the year.

Stone began dating English comedian David Walliams in September 2009. They announced their engagement in January 2010. They were married at London's Claridge's hotel on 16 May 2010. In November 2012, the couple announced that Stone was pregnant with their first child, due mid-2013. On 6 May 2013, Stone gave birth to a baby boy, Alfred. It was reported on 4 March 2015 that, following five years of marriage, the pair had decided to try a trial separation, after "drifting apart". On 9 September 2015, Walliams filed for divorce from Stone, citing "unreasonable behavior". The couple were granted a decree nisi the next day, dissolving the marriage six weeks after the date of filing. On 17 July 2021, she married property developer David Grievson.

Filmography

References

External links

 
 
 
 

1983 births
Living people
Dutch female models
Dutch people of English descent
Elite Model Management models
People from Geldrop
People from Mierlo
The Lions (agency) models
Prada exclusive models
21st-century Dutch women